Corporal punishment, sometimes referred to as "physical punishment" or "physical discipline", has been defined as the use of physical force, no matter how light, to cause deliberate bodily pain or discomfort in response to some undesired behavior. In schools in the United States, corporal punishment takes the form of a school teacher or administrator striking a student's buttocks with a wooden paddle (often called "spanking" or "paddling").

The practice was held constitutional in the 1977 Supreme Court case Ingraham v. Wright, where the Court held that the "cruel and unusual punishments" clause of the Eighth Amendment did not apply to disciplinary corporal punishment in public schools, being restricted to the treatment of prisoners convicted of a crime. In the years since, a number of U.S. states have banned corporal punishment in public schools. The most recent state to outlaw it was New Mexico in 2011, and the latest de facto statewide ban was in North Carolina in 2018, when the last school district in the state that had not yet banned it did so. 
In 2014, a student was struck in a U.S. public school an average of once every 30 seconds.

As of 2023, corporal punishment is still legal in private schools in every U.S. state except New Jersey and Iowa, legal in public schools in 19 states, and practiced in 15 of the states..

Corporal punishment in school has been outlawed in Canada, the European Union and other European countries, and New Zealand, which makes the United States one of three developed countries where corporal punishment in school is still allowed, alongside Australia and Singapore; the state of Queensland is the only jurisdiction in Australia where school corporal punishment is still technically legal. The practice is banned in 128 countries.

History

Corporal punishment was widely utilized in U.S. schools during the 19th and 20th centuries as a way to motivate students to perform better academically and maintain objectively good standards of behavior. The practice was generally considered a fair and rational way to discipline school children, particularly given its parallels to the criminal justice system, and teachers in the late 19th century were encouraged to employ corporal punishment over other types of discipline. In the English-speaking world, the right of teachers to discipline children is enshrined in the common-law doctrine in loco parentis (Latin for "in the place of parents"), which places a legal responsibility on authority-holders to take on the functions of a parent in some instances.

Some of the earliest parental opposition to corporal punishment in schools occurred in England in 1899 in the case Gardiner v. Bygrave, in which a teacher in London was acquitted after a parent took him to court for assault after he physically punished their son. This case set a precedent that schools could discipline children in the way they saw fit, regardless of the wishes of the parent regarding the physical punishment of their child. Over the next century, the conception of corporal punishment as a common component of disciplining students in public schools would be challenged in various countries, but opposition to corporal punishment in schools would not make it to the U.S. Supreme Court until 1977.

Federal law
In 1977, the question of the legality of corporal punishment in schools was brought to the Supreme Court. At this point, only New Jersey (1867), Massachusetts (1971), Hawaii (1973), and Maine (1975) had outlawed physical punishment in public schools, and just New Jersey had also outlawed the practice in private schools.

The U.S. Supreme Court upheld the legality of corporal punishment in schools in the landmark Ingraham v. Wright case. The court ruled five to four that the corporal punishment of James Ingraham, who was restrained by his assistant principal and paddled by the principal over twenty times, ultimately requiring medical attention, did not violate the Eighth Amendment, which protects citizens from cruel and unusual punishment. They further concluded that corporal punishment did not violate the due process clause of the Fourteenth Amendment, since teachers or administrators administering excessive punishment can face criminal charges. This case established a precedent of "reasonable, but not excessive" punishment of students and was criticized by some scholars as "an apparent low point in American teacher-student relations."

The Ingraham v. Wright ruling firmly pushed the decision of whether or not to outlaw corporal punishment in schools squarely onto state legislators. A majority of state bans on corporal punishment have occurred in the intervening years since 1977.

State law

Individual states have had the power to ban corporal punishment in public schools since the 19th century. Each state has the authority to define corporal punishment in its state laws, so bans on corporal punishment differ from state to state.

The first state to abolish school corporal punishment was New Jersey in 1867. In 1894, a Newark bill challenged this ruling, arguing that whipping should be legal if parents consented to it; the New Jersey House defeated that bill, with one doctor's testimonial asserting that the bill's provisions "would expose children who did not have thoughtful and careful parents to the cruel discrimination of the teachers." The second state to ban corporal punishment in schools was Massachusetts, 104 years later in 1971. As of 2023, corporal punishment is banned in state schools (known as public schools in the U.S.) in 31 states and the District of Columbia (see list below). The usage of corporal punishment in private schools is legally permitted in nearly every state. Only New Jersey and Iowa prohibit it in both public and private schools. Corporal punishment is still used in schools to a significant (though declining) extent in some public schools in Alabama, Arkansas, Georgia, Louisiana, Mississippi, Oklahoma, Tennessee, Kansas, and Texas. The most recent state to outlaw school corporal punishment was New Mexico in 2011.

The majority of students who experience corporal punishment reside in the Southern United States; Department of Education data from 2011–2012 show that 70 percent of students subjected to corporal punishment were from the five states of Alabama, Arkansas, Georgia, Mississippi, and Texas, with the latter two states accounting for 35 percent of corporal punishment cases.

Students can be physically punished from kindergarten to the end of high school, meaning that even legal adults who have reached the age of majority are sometimes spanked by school officials. In these states, parents are sometimes (but not always) given the option of physical punishment of their child instead of alternate disciplinary measures, like suspension.

Risks for school administrators

Even if several US states have approved strong immunity laws, there is always a risk for a principal or a teacher to be sued in court by parents who estimate that the corporal punishment went too far. The existence of social networks exposes the school administrator to public criticism and personal attack. In Texas, several principals have seen their certificate put at risk because of corporal punishments administered in previous school districts. Even when there's been no condemnation from a court, some parents may consider school administrators unfit if they have previously administered corporal punishments to students.

The presence of a witness during paddling is intended to protect the school administrator from any accusation of sexual abuses. However, the practice itself is at high risk due to the line between punishment and sexual assault being very narrow, especially with teens already in puberty.

As mentioned by Victor Vieth, senior director and founder of the Gundersen National Child Protection Training Center: "If you're leaving it up to teachers" to determine whether a student should be paddled, he said, "I'd tell them you do it at your own risk. If you exceed what a jury in your community says is reasonable, you're criminally liable."

Current state law as of 2023

Trends 

The prevalence of school corporal punishment has decreased since the 1970s, declining from four percent of the total number of children in schools in 1978 to less than one percent in 2014. This reduction is partially explained by the increasing number of states banning corporal punishment from public schools between 1974 and 1994.

The number of instances of corporal punishment in U.S. schools has also declined in recent years. In the 2002-2003 school year, federal statistics estimated that 300,000 children were disciplined with corporal punishment at school at least once. In the 2006-2007 school year, this number was reduced to 223,190 instances. According to the Department of Education, over 166,000 students in public schools were physically punished during the 2011–2012 school year. In the 2013-2014 academic year, this number was reduced to 109,000 students.

As of the 2011-2012 academic year, 19 states legally allowed school corporal punishment. Approximately 14 percent of the schools in those 19 states reported the use of corporal punishment, and one in eight students attended schools that use this practice.

In 2022 the number of the students beaten by their teachers dropped to circa 70,000. There are still 19 states where this practice has not been oficially banned.

Behaviors that elicit corporal punishment 

Several studies have explored which behaviors elicit corporal punishment as a response, but so far there is not a cohesive and standardized system in use within states or across states. Human Rights Watch conducted a series of interviews with paddled students and teachers in Mississippi and Texas, and found that most corporal punishment was for minor infractions, such as violating the dress code, being tardy, talking in class, running in the hallway and going to the bathroom without permission. A review of over 6,000 disciplinary files in Florida for 1987-1988 school year found that corporal punishment use in schools was not related to the severity of student's misbehavior or with the frequency of the infraction. Czumbil and Hyman reviewed over 500 media stories about corporal punishment in newspapers from 1975 to 1992 and coded the reason of the punishment and its severity. They found that the nature of the child's misbehavior (violent or non-violent) did not meaningfully influence whether the student was physically punished or not.

Disparities 
Many studies have found that there are disparities in the physical punishment of students across racial and ethnic lines, gender and disability status. In general, results suggest that boys, students of color and students with disabilities are more likely to be targets of corporal punishment. These disparities may violate three federal laws that prohibit discrimination by race, gender and disability status: Title VI of the Civil Rights Act of 1964, Title IX of the Education Amendments of 1972, and Section 504 of the Rehabilitation Act of 1973.

By gender 
At the turn of the 20th century, both boys and girls received roughly equal levels of corporal punishments in U.S. schools, but girls were more likely to report their punishment as unjust or unfair. However, while punishment was seen as a builder of masculinity for boys, girls were not expected to experience the same benefits, so their punishment was often, but not always, more lenient. This trend in gender parity changed significantly in the next century.

According to a 2015 study, boys are more likely than girls to be physically punished in schools, and this disparity has persisted for decades. In 1992, boys accounted for 81 percent of all incidents of physical discipline in schools. 

Differences in behavior (and perceived behavior) can explain part of this imbalance, but do not account for the entire discrepancy between the genders. Boys have been found to be two times as likely as girls to be disciplined for misbehavior in school, but they are four times as likely to be disciplined with corporal punishment.

When race and gender are considered together, black boys are 16 times as likely to be subject of corporal punishment as white girls. Among children with disabilities, black boys have the highest probability of being subject to corporal punishment, followed by white boys, black girls and white girls. While black boys are 1.8 times as likely as white boys to be physically punished, black girls are three times more likely than white girls to receive corporal punishment.

By race or ethnicity 
The race and ethnic disparities in school corporal punishment have decreased within groups over time, but the relative prevalence of corporal punishment between groups has remained stable. Black students are physically punished at higher rates than white or Hispanics. In contrast, Hispanic students are less likely than white students to receive corporal punishment. One study found that African-American students were more likely than either white or Hispanic students to be physically punished, by 2.5 times and 6.5 times respectively. Another study calculated the proportion of black students who were physically punished to the proportion of white students who were by state, and found that for the 2011-2012 academic year, black children in Alabama and Mississippi were over five times more likely to be disciplined with corporal punishment than their white counterparts. In other southeastern states (Florida, Arkansas, Georgia, Louisiana and Tennessee) black children were more than three times more likely to receive corporal punishment than white children.

A review of over 4,000 discipline events in Florida from 1987 to 1989 across nine schools revealed that, although black students constituted 22 percent of school enrollment, they accounted for over 50 percent of all cases of corporal punishment. The North Carolina Department of Public Instruction in 2013 published a review of corporal punishment cases in the 2011–2012 academic year founding that corporal punishment was disproportionately applied to Native American students, who represented 58 percent of all cases of corporal punishment while being only two percent of the student population.

The disparity by race in the use of corporal punishment in schools goes in line with findings of other methods of discipline, where black children are two to three times more likely than white children to be suspended or expelled from schools. According to a study by the American Psychological Association, these imbalances are not due to a higher likelihood of misbehaving by children of one race over another, or the socio-economic status of the children.

By disability status 
Children with physical, mental, or emotional disabilities are afforded special protections and services in U.S. public schools. However, they are not afforded protection from school corporal punishment in the states that allow it, and in many states they are actually at greater risk for receiving corporal punishment than their non-disabled peers. According to a report jointly authored by Human Rights Watch and the American Civil Liberties Union, the United States Department of Education's Civil Rights Data Collection for 2006 shows that students with disabilities are subjected to corporal punishment at disproportionately high rates for their share of the population. Representative Carolyn McCarthy remarked in a 2010 congressional hearing that students with disabilities are subjected to corporal punishment at "approximately twice the rate of the general student population in some States."

Children with disabilities are 50 percent more likely to experience school corporal punishment in more than 30 percent of the school districts in Alabama, Arkansas, Georgia, Louisiana, Mississippi and Tennessee. However, in some school districts among Alabama, Mississippi and Tennessee, children with disability status are five times more likely to be subject of corporal punishment than peers without disabilities.

Effects 
Although there is literature on the effects of parental use of corporal punishment on health and school performance, corporal punishment in schools has been understudied. There are correlational studies that linked the use of corporal punishment in schools with detrimental physical and psychological effects on children, and also provide evidence about its long-term effects.

According to these studies, children exposed to school corporal punishment are more likely to have conduct disorder problems, to experience feelings of inadequacy and resentment, to be aggressive and violent, and to experience reduced problem-solving abilities, social competence and academic achievement. Other studies have suggested that corporal punishment in schools can deter children's cognitive development, as children subject to corporal punishment in schools have a more restricted vocabulary, poorer school marks, and lower IQ scores. Moreover, disparities in the use of corporal punishment among gender, race and disability status can be perceived by children as discrimination. This perceived discrimination has been related with lower self-esteem, lower positive mood, higher depression and anxiety. These effects can also manifest as low academic engagement and more negative school behaviors, which exacerbate the existing gap in discipline policies along race and gender lines.

Researchers have found a negative correlation between legality of corporal punishment and test scores. Students who are not exposed to school corporal punishment exhibit better results on the ACT test compared to students in states that allow disciplinary corporal punishment in schools. In 2010, 75 percent of states that allow corporal punishment in schools scored below average on the ACT composite, while three-quarters of non-paddling states scored above the national average. Improvement trend among the years also differ; in the last 18 years, 66 percent of non-paddling states have above average rates of improvement, while 50 percent of spanking states were above the national trend of improvement.

Furthermore, while corporal punishment is sometimes lauded as an alternative to suspension, the lack of formal training for U.S. teachers means that there is no consistently implemented style of corporal punishment that takes into account the size, age, or psychological profile of students. This leaves students more vulnerable to physical and psychological injury.

In November 2018 the American Academy of Pediatrics issued a new policy statement taking a stronger stance against corporal punishment, including spanking, twenty years after releasing its last position statement on effective discipline.

The AAP mentioned in particular the risks on mental health issues and anger management problems, in children and teens who received corporal punishments in school.

Public opinion 
Public-opinion research has found that most Americans are not in favor of school corporal punishment; in polls taken in 2002 and 2005, American adults were respectively 72% and 77% opposed to the use of corporal punishment by teachers. Moreover, a national survey conducted on teachers ranked corporal punishment as the least effective method to discipline offenders among eight possible techniques.

A bill to end the use of corporal punishment in schools was introduced into the United States House of Representatives in June 2010 during the 111th Congress. The bill, H.R. 5628, was referred to the United States House Committee on Education and Labor, where it was not brought up for a vote.

The United States' National Association of Secondary School Principals (NASSP) opposes the use of corporal punishment in schools, defined as the deliberate infliction of pain in response to students' unacceptable behavior or language. In articulating its opposition, it cites the disproportionate use of corporal punishment on black students; potential adverse effects on students' self-image and school achievement; correlation between school corporal punishment and increased truancy, drop-out rates, violence, and vandalism by youth; the potential for misuse or injury to students; and increased liability for schools.

Some scholars, such as Elizabeth Gershoff and Sarah Font, perceive a double standard when it comes to the physical punishment of children versus adults. The Board of Education in Pickens County, Alabama recommends that teachers use a two-foot-long paddle to discipline children; in some cases, this object is more than half the height of an elementary school-aged child. The two scholars assert that in any other context, "the act of an adult hitting another person with a board [two feet long] (or really, of any size) would be considered assault with a weapon and would be punishable under criminal law".

However, some teachers and administrators defend the use of corporal punishment in the classroom as a reasonable alternative to other types of disciplinary action, like suspension, which have been shown to negatively impact children's classroom performance and social skills.

The student's choice in favor of corporal punishment is often dictated by the parents and by the fact that a corporal punishment is not reported on student's personal record, when a suspension is duly recorded and can jeopardize the access to the university. Often students accept a physical punishment as a way to erase the record of the infraction.

In March 2018, the mother of Wylie Greer, a senior year student, published a tweet that became viral. She reported that during a national gun control student walkout, her son and two other students walked out of class in Greenbrier High School of Greenbrier, Arkansas. That same day, the assistant principal Mr. Brett Meek informed Wylie of the consequences: two days of suspension or two "swats" with a wooden paddle. Wylie chose the corporal punishment, as did the two others. In Arkansas, students 18 years or older can be paddled in school since the law regulating school corporal punishments "allow individual school districts to draft their own policies" with no indicated limits concerning the student's age.

In the 2018 case of Ayers v. Wells, Mr. Ayers, assistant principal of Etowah Middle School in Alabama, was accused of excessive use of force during a paddling incident in 2016. Judge William Ogletree refused to dismiss the charges of child abuse against Ayers and held that immunity laws cannot be an excuse for using disproportionate force during punishments. In May 2019, the charges were dropped on the grounds of Alabama's immunity laws.

In September 2018, the Georgia School of Innovation and the Classics in Georgia sparked controversy when the superintendent Jody Boulineau proposed a reintroduction of corporal punishment. One-third of the parents agreed with the proposal. Mr. Boulineau, in an interview with CBS, said that he was surprised by the outrage from some parents. Google review ratings for the school dropped by two points, and several parents expressed in their reviews that they wished to find school alternatives, for fear of their children's safety. The school engaged in a counter-campaign to seek to boost the lowered Google review rating.

On 3 October 2018, Gary L. Gunckel, the principal of schools in Indianola, Oklahoma, was charged with two counts of felony child assault after paddling that left two boys with deep bruises. One of the children fell to the ground during paddling, and Gunckel apologized to one of the mothers for punishing the boys. Gunckel was placed on administrative leave as reported by local press. Even though the lawsuit for child abuse was dismissed, a new lawsuit had been filled by the parents of the two boys in August 2020 because one of the boys was in a protective education program and the other one had severe physical consequences for weeks after the punishment. The contract of Mr. Gunkel was not renewed by the school district. 

Corporal punishments are widespread in Florida and the laws permitting them have been argued to enable the abuse of children (including those with mental disabilities). In Florida there is no opt-out option, which means corporal punishments can be administered against the will of the parents, and in some areas it is impossible to find a school district that does not apply them. All kinds of corporal punishments against students are legal in Florida, unless as Florida state's attorney declared, the children suffered from serious injuries.

In January 2019, Ashley Lauer, mother of a sixth grade student at Macon County Jr. High School in Tennessee, published on social media the pictures of her son after paddling that left deep bruises and welts on his buttocks. After a short investigation, Ms. Lauer was informed by Child Protection Services (DCS) that they did not find any wrongdoing by the school. Ms. Lauer took to social media to bring awareness to the parents who are giving their consent to corporal punishments in school.

On 25 January 2019, a Memphis teacher at Cummings Elementary School hit the face of Hailey Turner, age five, with a ruler, leaving visible bruises next to her left eye. The girl's family complained that the teacher tried in first instance to bribe the little girl offering a doll if she did not say anything. After that, the teacher tried to convince the family that the bruises were an allergic reaction. The teacher was suspended for two days, and Turner was moved to another class. The family decided to transfer Turner to another school. Tennessee is one of the 19 states that allow corporal punishments in school and has strong immunity laws to protect teachers from prosecution.

In March 2019, on the ground of immunity laws, a Chilton County, Alabama grand jury refused to indict principal D.J. Nix of Jemison Intermediate School in connection with the paddling of a child with autism. The child was restrained and paddled five times, leaving him with deep bruises. In 2017, the Alabama Association of School Boards voted to amend its stance on corporal punishment from urging schools to discourage corporal punishment to prohibiting it.

Several coaches, teachers and the principal of Warren Easton High School in New Orleans were named in a 2019 lawsuit claiming corporal punishment of a student, which is prohibited by the local school board. In addition, it was alleged that football players had been slapped on their bare backs. The mother of a student also claimed that the students were asked not to tell anyone about the punishments.

In November 2019, a Faulkner County, Arkansas mother named Lydia Payne told the media that her son had received corporal punishment at Guy-Perkins High School. Instead of receiving a mere spanking, Payne stated that her son was beaten and bruised. "My son's entire buttock is very deeply black and blue", Payne said. Apparently, the procedure laid out by the school district had been followed. A report indicated that an investigation was underway, but added that immunity laws protect the school administrator if procedure has been followed.

In April 2021, a principal at Central Elementary in Clewiston, Florida, paddled a six-year-old girl in front of her mother for damaging a computer. The mother was an undocumented immigrant, and there was confusion as to what the mother consented to have done (allowing the child to be spanked, paddled, etc). The incident was recorded, and published by local media. The school district highlighted that the regulations forbid corporal punishments, and encourage alternative methods of discipline. The State Attorney's Office declined to pursue a case against the principal, citing the incident as legally conducted.

See also
 Corporal punishment in the home
 Corporal punishment of minors in the United States
 Judicial corporal punishment
 School corporal punishment

References

External links
 Office for Civil Rights, U.S. Department of Education
 A Violent Education: Corporal Punishment of Children in U.S. Public Schools, American Civil Liberties Union and Human Rights Watch
 In 19 States, It's Still Legal to Spank Children in Public Schools,https://www.nytimes.com/2018/12/13/us/corporal-punishment-school-tennessee.html

Education in the United States
Corporal punishments in the United States
Corporal
Spanking
Children's rights in the United States